Hoplocryptanthus tiradentesensis is a species of flowering plant in the family Bromeliaceae, endemic to Brazil (the state of Minas Gerais). It was first described by Leme in 2007 as Cryptanthus tiradentesensis.

References

Bromelioideae
Flora of Brazil
Plants described in 2007